Gowyjeh Qomlaq or Guyjeh Qamalaq, also rendered as Gowjeh Qamalaq, may refer to:
 Gowyjeh Qomlaq, Hashtrud
 Guyjeh Qamalaq, Maragheh